Harold V. Brown (October 2, 1923 – September 1980) was an American professional basketball player.

He played collegiately for the University of Evansville from 1941 to 1942 and 1944 to 1946.

He played for the Detroit Falcons in the Basketball Association of America (BAA) for 54 games during the 1946–47 season, and the Kansas City Blues of the Professional Basketball League of America (PBLA) during the 1947–48 season.

BAA career statistics

Regular season

References

External links

1923 births
1980 deaths
American men's basketball players
Evansville Purple Aces men's basketball players
Detroit Falcons (basketball) players
Guards (basketball)